Martellago is a comune (municipality) in the Metropolitan City of Venice, in the Italian region of Veneto.

References

External links
Street map from (Google Maps)

Cities and towns in Veneto